The Phileo Damansara station is a mass rapid transit station serving the Phileo Damansara Commercial Centre and the northern sections of Petaling Jaya (Sections 16, 17, 17A and 19), Selangor, Malaysia.

The station is on the MRT Sungai Buloh-Kajang Line and was opened on 16 December 2016 under Phase One operations of the line.

Station location
The station adopts the standard elevated station design of the MRT Sungai Buloh-Kajang Line with two levels. However, unlike most of the elevated stations, the station has an island platform with two sides above the concourse level.

The station is located north of the Sprint Expressway near the Phileo Damansara Interchange. This places the station in the Federal Territory of Kuala Lumpur, with one entrance crossing the border into Selangor. The location was formerly occupied by a Shell petrol station and a second hand car dealer. The headquarters of The Star newspaper is located nearby. Located behind the station is a golf course.

Station layout

Exits and entrances
The station has two entrances. Entrance A is located across the Sprint Expressway (and also across the Selangor-Kuala Lumpur border) from the station, at the side of Jalan 16/11 and adjacent to the Phileo Damansara Commercial Centre. It is connected to the station by a pedestrian link bridge over the Sprint Highway. Entrance B is on the north side of the Sprint Highway (same side as the station).

Services and connections

Services
Phileo Damansara is between Pusat Bandar Damansara and TTDI stations on the MRT Kajang Line. In the future, Bukit Kiara will become the new adjacent station in place of Pusat Bandar Damansara. Frequencies are usually every 8 minutes at a minimum, but may vary between 4 and 10 minutes. This applies to trains in both directions. Sometimes, trains may begin or end their service at Phileo Damansara, with a maximum of two trains to be stabled at Phileo Damansara siding.

Connections
When Kajang Line services began, two feeder bus services started running, linking the station with several residential areas in the northern part of Petaling Jaya (south and west of the station) and the University of Malaya. These feeder buses operate from entrance A. Frequencies of these buses vary from time to time, but are generally every 15 to 20 minutes on average.

Gallery

Notes and References

Notes

References

External links

 Klang Valley Mass Rapid Transit website
 Unofficial information resource on the MRT

Rapid transit stations in Kuala Lumpur
Sungai Buloh-Kajang Line
Railway stations opened in 2016